is a national formula racing championship that takes place in Japan. It is a junior-level feeder formula that uses the same single seater chassis as the pan-European Euroformula Open Championship.  The series will be the first with the new branding as a feeder series for the Super Formula championship. The nomenclature is similar to that of IndyCar, whose support series also uses the "Lights" moniker.

Origins

The Super Formula Lights championship started in 1979 as a Formula 3-based series originally known as the Japanese Formula 3 Championship. Because of changes with FIA nomenclature ("Formula Regional" is now used for all regional F3-based series to prevent confusion with the FIA Formula 3 Championship), and the change from Formula Regional standards used in such series (such as the Formula Regional European Championship and Formula Regional Americas Championship; in Japan, K2 Planet acquired the rights to run a Formula Regional championship in Japan, the Formula Regional Japanese Championship from the FIA) to sharing a single specification rule set with the Euroformula Open Championship, similar to Germany's Deutsche Tourenwagen Masters and Japan's Super GT sharing a single Class 1 formula touring car, on 17 August 2019 the series promoters surrendered the rights to the Formula Regional championship in Japan and rebranded the series to Super Formula Lights.

Equipment
The Series has similar rules to Euroformula Open Championship, which forced the name change in 2020.

 Chassis:
 Dallara remains the specification chassis builder for Super Formula Championship for the 2020 season, with the Dallara 320 shared with Euroformula Open being used. The new chassis features revamped aerodynamics and a Halo intrusion device.
 Engines:
 Toyota-TOM'S, Mugen-Honda, Toda Racing and ThreeBond (Nissan) would remain as official series engine partners from 2020 season. The Spiess Tuning Volkswagen R4 engine proved to be popular.
 Tyres:
 Yokohama would remain as sole tyre partner for the series that has been involved since 2011 season.

Champions

Circuits 

 Bold denotes a circuit used in the 2022 season.

 Italic denotes a formerly used circuit.

Notes

References

External links
Super Formula Lights official website – Japanese / English

See also
 Indy NXT Series
 Super2 Series
 DTM Trophy
 FIA Formula 2
 FIA Formula 3

Auto racing series in Japan
Recurring sporting events established in 2020
National championships in Japan
Japanese Formula 3 Championship